Swangard Stadium is a multi-purpose stadium in Central Park in Burnaby, British Columbia. Primarily used for soccer, rugby, football, and athletics, the stadium also used to be home to the Simon Fraser Clan football team and the Vancouver Whitecaps while they were in the Canadian Soccer League (CSL) and various US-based Division 2 leagues. It opened on April 26, 1969, and has a capacity of 5,288.

History

In 1969, Vancouver Sun sports journalist Erwin Swangard raised nearly $1 million for the construction of an athletic stadium in Central Park in Burnaby, British Columbia. British Columbia Premier W. A. C. Bennett officially named the stadium after Swangard at its opening on April 26, 1969. Swangard was not present on the day of the opening, having been sent to start a newspaper in Nigeria.

Vancouver Whitecaps
The city of Vancouver launched a professional soccer team in 1986, named the Vancouver 86ers (now known as the Whitecaps). The Canadian Soccer League (CSL) club began playing in 1987 and made Swangard Stadium their home pitch. The stadium served its last season as the Whitecaps' home in 2010, as the club joined Major League Soccer (MLS) in 2011. As Swangard does not meet MLS standards for capacity, the City of Burnaby initially proposed to keep the team in Burnaby by renovating the stadium and expanding its capacity to 20,000 seats. This plan, however, fell through, and the Whitecaps eventually decided they wanted to move to a new, larger soccer-specific home at the Whitecaps Waterfront Stadium. Currently the Whitecaps are playing at BC Place Stadium and president of the organization, Bob Lenarduzzi has stated the club intends to stay at BC Place for the time being and plans for a new stadium are all on hold.

International events
The stadium's capacity was temporarily increased to 10,000 for the 2007 FIFA U-20 World Cup. In the past, it has hosted home games for the Canadian men's and women's soccer teams in Olympic and World Cup qualifying. In some cases, crowds in excess of 10,000 have witnessed games, with many of the fans standing. Swangard has also been the host stadium of the 2002 FIFA U-19 Women's World Championship.

Other events
In 2013, the Vancouver Riptide, a professional ultimate team competing in the American Ultimate Disc League, became a tenant of Swangard Stadium but they ended play at end of 2017 season and are being moved to Portland, Oregon for the 2020 season.

In June 2014, Simon Fraser Clan announced that Swangard Stadium would be their football team's home field for the 2014 season. The Clan returned to their campus again starting with the 2016 season.

It is also used very frequently for track and field meets in the Lower Mainland.

In March 2015, the first Quidditch Canada National Championship took place at the stadium.

The TSS FC Rovers played their home soccer games there starting in the 2017 season when they played in the USL League Two Northwest Division. The TSS FC Rovers Women's team of the Women's Premier Soccer League also use the stadium as their home. They started play in the 2018 season. Starting in the 2022 season, both men's and women's teams will play in the new League1 British Columbia (L1BC) soccer league.

The Whitecaps FC 2 of the MLS Next Pro, the reserve team of the Vancouver Whitecaps FC of Major League Soccer, will play all their home games at the stadium starting in March 2022.

References

External links
City of Burnaby's information on the stadium
Information from Vancouver Whitecaps Official Site

Athletics (track and field) venues in Canada
Buildings and structures in Burnaby
Canadian football venues in British Columbia
Multi-purpose stadiums in British Columbia
Soccer venues in British Columbia
Sport in Burnaby
Sports venues in British Columbia
Tourist attractions in Burnaby
Simon Fraser Red Leafs football
Ultimate (sport) venues
College football venues
Sports venues completed in 1969
1969 establishments in British Columbia